The women's 200 metres event at the 1977 Summer Universiade was held at the Vasil Levski National Stadium in Sofia on 21 and 22 August.

Medalists

Results

Heats
Held on 21 August

Wind:Heat 1: -0.2 m/s, Heat 2: ? m/s, Heat 3: +0.2 m/s, Heat 4: ? m/s

Semifinals
Held on 22 August

Wind:Heat 1: ? m/s, Heat 2: +0.2 m/s

Final
Held on 22 August

Wind: -2.2 m/s

References

Athletics at the 1977 Summer Universiade
1977